was the 123rd Emperor of Japan, according to the traditional order of succession, and the second ruler of the Empire of Japan from 30 July 1912 until his death in 1926.

According to Japanese custom, while reigning the Emperor is simply called "the Emperor". After death, he is known by a posthumous name, which is the name of the era coinciding with his reign. Having ruled during the Taishō era, he is known as the "Emperor Taishō".

Early life 
Prince Yoshihito was born at the Tōgū Palace in Akasaka, Tokyo to Emperor Meiji and Yanagiwara Naruko, a concubine with the official title of gon-no-tenji (imperial concubine). As was common practice at the time, Emperor Meiji's consort, Empress Shōken, was officially regarded as his mother. He received the personal name of Yoshihito Shinnō and the title Haru-no-miya from the Emperor on 6 September 1879. His two older siblings had died in infancy, and he too was born sickly.

Prince Yoshihito contracted cerebral meningitis within three weeks of his birth. 

As was the practice at the time, Prince Yoshihito was entrusted to the care of his great-grandfather, Marquess Nakayama Tadayasu, in whose house he lived from infancy until the age of seven. Prince Nakayama had also raised his grandson, Emperor Meiji, as a child.

From March 1885, Prince Yoshihito moved to the Aoyama Detached Palace, where he was tutored in the mornings on reading, writing, arithmetic, and morals, and in the afternoons on sports, but progress was slow due to his poor health and frequent fevers. From 1886, he was taught together with 15–20 selected classmates from the ōke and higher ranking kazoku peerage at a special school, the Gogakumonsho, within the Aoyama Palace.

Yoshihito was officially declared heir on 31 August 1887, and had his formal investiture as crown prince on 3 November 1888.

Education and training 

When Yoshihito became the age to enter elementary school in 1886, due to his health problems, Takehiko Yumoto was appointed as the special education officer to educate him within the Tōgū Palace.
For this health reasons, he spent much of his youth at the Imperial villas at Hayama and Numazu, both of which are located at the sea. Although the prince showed skill in some areas, such as horse riding, he proved to be poor in areas requiring higher-level thought. He was finally withdrawn from Gakushuin before finishing the middle school course in 1894. However, he did appear to have an aptitude for languages and continued to receive extensive tutoring in French, Chinese, and history from private tutors at the Akasaka Palace; Emperor Meiji gave Prince Takehito responsibility for taking care of Prince Yoshihito, and the two princes became friends.

From 1898, largely at the insistence of Itō Hirobumi, the Prince began to attend sessions of the House of Peers of the Diet of Japan as a way of learning about the political and military concerns of the country. In the same year, he gave his first official receptions to foreign diplomats, with whom he was able to shake hands and converse graciously. His infatuation with western culture and tendency to sprinkle French words into his conversations was a source of irritation for Emperor Meiji.

In October 1898, the Prince also traveled from the Numazu Imperial Villa to Kobe, Hiroshima, and Etajima, visiting sites connected with the Imperial Japanese Navy. He made another tour in 1899 to Kyūshū, visiting government offices, schools and factories (such as Yawata Iron and Steel in Fukuoka and the Mitsubishi shipyards in Nagasaki).

Marriage 

On 10 May 1900, Crown Prince Yoshihito married the then 15-year-old Kujō Sadako, daughter of Prince Kujō Michitaka, the head of the five senior branches of the Fujiwara clan. She had been carefully selected by Emperor Meiji for her intelligence, articulation, and pleasant disposition and dignity – to complement Prince Yoshihito in the areas where he was lacking. The Akasaka Palace was constructed from 1899 to 1909 in a lavish European rococo style, to serve as the Crown Prince's official residence. The Prince and Princess had the following children: Hirohito, Yasuhito, Nobuhito, Takahito

In 1902, Yoshihito continued his tours to observe the customs and geography of Japan, this time of central Honshū, where he visited the noted Buddhist temple of Zenkō-ji in Nagano. With tensions rising between Japan and Russia, Yoshihito was promoted in 1903 to the rank of colonel in the Imperial Japanese Army and captain in the Imperial Japanese Navy. His military duties were only ceremonial, but he traveled to inspect military facilities in Wakayama, Ehime, Kagawa and Okayama that year.

In October 1907, the Crown Prince toured Korea, accompanied by Admiral Tōgō Heihachirō, General Katsura Tarō, and Prince Arisugawa Taruhito. It was the first time an heir apparent to the throne had ever left Japan. During this period, he began studying the Korean language, although he never became proficient at it.

Issue 
Emperor Taishō and Empress Teimei had four sons and twelve grandchildren (five grandsons and seven granddaughters).

As emperor 

On 30 July 1912, upon the death of his father, Emperor Meiji, Prince Yoshihito ascended the throne. The new emperor was kept out of view of the public as much as possible, having suffered from various neurological problems. At the 1913 opening of the Imperial Diet of Japan, one of the rare occasions he was seen in public, he is famously reported to have rolled his prepared speech into a cylinder and stared at the assembly through it, as if through a spyglass. Although rumors attributed this to poor mental condition, others, including those who knew him well, believed that he may have been checking to make sure the speech was rolled up properly, as his manual dexterity was also handicapped.

His lack of articulation and charisma, his disabilities and his eccentricities, led to an increase in incidents of lèse majesté. As his condition deteriorated, he had less and less interest in daily political affairs, and the ability of the genrō, Keeper of the Privy Seal, and Imperial Household Minister to manipulate his decisions came to be a matter of common knowledge. The two-party political system that had been developing in Japan since the turn of the century came of age after World War I, giving rise to the nickname for the period, "Taishō Democracy", prompting a shift in political power to the Imperial Diet of Japan and the democratic parties.

After 1918, the emperor no longer was able to attend Army or Navy maneuvers, appear at the graduation ceremonies of the military academies, perform the annual Shinto ritual ceremonies, or even attend the official opening of sessions of the Diet of Japan.

After 1919, he undertook no official duties, and Crown Prince Hirohito was named prince regent (sesshō) on 25 November 1921.

The emperor's reclusive life was unaffected by the Spanish Flu Pandemic of 1918 and Great Kantō Earthquake of 1923.  Fortuitously, he had moved by imperial train to Tamozawa Imperial Villa at Nikko the week before the devastating calamity; but his son, Crown Prince Hirohito, remained at the Imperial Palace where he was at the heart of the event.  Carrier pigeons kept the Emperor informed as information about the extent of the devastation became known.

Death 

In early December 1926, it was announced that the emperor had pneumonia. He died of a heart attack at 1:25 a.m. in the early morning of December 25, 1926, at the Hayama Imperial Villa at Hayama, on Sagami Bay south of Tokyo (in Kanagawa Prefecture). He was 47 years old and succeeded by his eldest son, Hirohito, Emperor Shōwa.

The funeral was held at night (February 7 to February 8, 1927) and consisted of a 4-mile-long procession in which 20,000 mourners followed a herd of sacred bulls and an ox-drawn cart containing the imperial coffin. The funeral route was lit with wood fires in iron lanterns. The emperor's coffin was then transported to his mausoleum in the western suburbs of Tokyo.

Emperor Taishō has been called the first Tokyo Emperor because he was the first to live his entire life in or near Tokyo. His father was born and reared in Kyoto; and although he later lived and died in Tokyo, Emperor Meiji's mausoleum is located on the outskirts of Kyoto, near the tombs of his imperial forebears; but Emperor Taishō's grave is in Tokyo, in the Musashi Imperial Graveyard in Hachiōji. His wife and his son, the Emperor Shōwa, are buried near him.

Honours

National honours 
 Grand Cordon of the Supreme Order of the Chrysanthemum, 3 November 1889; Collar, 10 May 1900
 Order of the Golden Kite, 3rd class, 1 April 1906

Foreign honours 
 : Grand Cross of the Order of St. Stephen, 18 July 1900
 : Grand Cordon of the Order of Leopold (military), July 1898
 : Knight of the Order of the Elephant, 9 October 1899
 : Grand Cross of the Legion of Honour, 3 May 1899
 : Knight of the Order of the Black Eagle, 21 December 1899
 : Knight of the Order of St. Hubert, 16 March 1904
  Kingdom of Greece:
 Grand Cross of the Order of George I
 Grand Cross of the Order of the Redeemer
 :
 Knight of the Supreme Order of the Most Holy Annunciation, 22 March 1900
 Grand Cross of the Order of Saints Maurice and Lazarus, 22 March 1900
 Grand Cross of the Order of the Crown of Italy, 22 March 1900
 : Grand Cordon of the Order of the Golden Ruler, 20 September 1900
 : Grand Cross of the Order of the Netherlands Lion, 12 July 1900
 : Grand Cross of the Order of St. Olav, with Collar, 26 September 1922
 : Knight of the Order of the White Eagle
 : Grand Cross of the Sash of the Two Orders, April 1904
 : Knight of the Order of St. Andrew, 2 July 1900
  Siam: Knight of the Order of the Royal House of Chakri, 26 October 1899
 : Knight of the Order of the Golden Fleece, 17 May 1896
 : Knight of the Order of the Seraphim, 20 September 1907
 : Stranger Knight of the Order of the Garter, 18 September 1912

See also 

 Taishō period

References

Citations

Sources 
 Hammer, Joshua. (2006).  Yokohama Burning: the Deadly 1923 Earthquake and Fire that Helped Forge the Path to World War II.  New York: Simon & Schuster.  (cloth)
 Seidensticker, Edward. (1990). Tokyo Rising. New York: Alfred A. Knopf.  (cloth) [reprinted by Harvard University Press, Cambridge, 1991:  (paper)]
 Bix, Herbert P. Hirohito and the Making of Modern Japan. Harper Perennial (2001). 
 Fujitani, T. Splendid Monarchy: Power and Pageantry in Modern Japan. University of California Press; Reprint edition (1998). 
 Keene, Donald. Emperor Of Japan: Meiji And His World, 1852–1912. Columbia University Press (2005).

External links
 

 
Japanese emperors

1879 births
1926 deaths
 Emperor Taisho
Emperor Taisho
Emperor Taisho
Japanese military personnel
Taisho, Emperor of Japan
Japanese princes
Japanese Shintoists
People from Tokyo
19th-century Japanese people
20th-century Japanese monarchs
Sons of emperors
Recipients of the Order of the Sacred Treasure, 1st class
Recipients of the Order of the Rising Sun with Paulownia Flowers
Recipients of the Order of the Golden Kite
Taisho, Emperor of Japan
Taisho, Emperor of Japan
Grand Crosses of the Order of Saint Stephen of Hungary
2
2
Recipients of the Order of the Netherlands Lion
Grand Croix of the Légion d'honneur
Recipients of the Order of the White Eagle (Poland)